The following is a list of notable people who were born in, lived in or are associated with the city of Winter Haven, Florida:

Frank Attkisson, politician
Andre Berto, professional welterweight boxer
Otis Birdsong, former professional basketball player
George A. "Banana George" Blair, professional barefoot skier 
Kenneth Brokenburr, gold medalist, 4x100 meter relay team at the 2000 Summer Olympics
Lem Burnham, football player
Chris Cameron, gymnast
Stephen Christian, lead singer of Anberlin
Tim Ford, Mississippi lawyer and legislator
Rowdy Gaines, Olympic 3-time gold medal swimmer 
Michael Griffin, U.S. Representative from Wisconsin
Gloria Hendry, actress
Ralph Houk, former manager of Major League Baseball's New York Yankees, Detroit Tigers, and Boston Red Sox
Gene Leedy, modern architect
Charlie Manuel, former manager of MLB's Philadelphia Phillies
Jake Owen, country singer
Kathleen Parker, author and syndicated columnist 
Gram Parsons, country and rock musician
James Lord Pierpont, songwriter of Jingle Bells. Uncle of J.P. Morgan.
Dick Pope, Sr., founder of Cypress Gardens and famed water-skier
Dick Pope, Jr., former world champion water-skier and bare-foot water-skier
Alex Ramirez, professional baseball player
Lawrence Scarpa, architect
Jordan Schafer, MLB player
Burt Shotton, former manager of MLB's Philadelphia Phillies and Brooklyn Dodgers
John A. Snively, pioneer citrus grower, developed extensive groves in the Winter Haven area
Jim Stafford, country singer
Dewey Tomko, professional poker player
O.D. Wilson, powerlifter and professional strongman
Gary Wright, singer, actor, arts educator/presenter
Michael Yon, journalist

References

Winter Haven
 
Winter Haven, Florida
Winter Haven